The George F. Heusner House is a house located in northwest Portland, Oregon listed on the National Register of Historic Places.

See also
 National Register of Historic Places listings in Northwest Portland, Oregon

References

Further reading

1894 establishments in Oregon
Edgar M. Lazarus buildings
Houses completed in 1894
Houses on the National Register of Historic Places in Portland, Oregon
Queen Anne architecture in Oregon
Shingle Style architecture in Oregon
Northwest Portland, Oregon
Portland Historic Landmarks
Historic district contributing properties in Oregon